Place des Ternes is a square in the 8th and 17th arrondissements of Paris, at the junction of Avenue de Wagram, Boulevard de Courcelles, Rue du Faubourg-Saint-Honoré and Avenue des Ternes. It has borne its present name since 1893. In the middle of the square is the Paris Métro Line 2 station Ternes. It is located in the centre of one of the most vibrant communities of the city. Place de Ternes is surrounded by various markets, parks, landmarks and local shops such as the Marché du Poncelet and Parc Monceau. 

It takes its name from its neighborhood with the Avenue des Ternes which crossed the old hamlet of Ternes .

Ternes
Buildings and structures in the 8th arrondissement of Paris
Buildings and structures in the 17th arrondissement of Paris